Margaret Adamson is an Australian diplomat who has served as Deputy High Commissioner to Papua New Guinea; Ambassador to Cambodia; Ambassador to Poland; Consul General to Berlin; and High Commissioner to Pakistan.

Education and career 
Adamson graduated from Australian National University with a BA in Pure Mathematics and Psychology with a minor in Sociology in 1974 and a Diploma of Education at the University of Canberra. She then served in the Australian diplomatic missions to Hanoi and Vienna. From 1987 to 1991, she served as a counsellor for the Australian embassy in Bonn, and after German reunification, until 1996 in Berlin.

From 1998 to 2002, she served as Ambassador to Poland. Following her return from Poland, she became a senior official within the Australian Department of Foreign Affairs and Trade. In 2007, she was named Ambassador to Cambodia, taking over from Lisa Filipetto. Her most recent posting was as High Commissioner to Pakistan from 2015 to 2019.

References

Consuls
Australian National University alumni
University of Canberra alumni
Australian women ambassadors
Ambassadors of Australia to Poland
Ambassadors of Australia to Cambodia
High Commissioners of Australia to Pakistan
Living people
Year of birth missing (living people)